Justin Tanner is a Los Angeles playwright. He is the author of "Wife Swappers" and "Oklahomo" (both staged at the Third Stage Theater in Burbank) and "Space Therapy" (at the Zephyr Theater in Hollywood, nominated for an L.A. Stage Alliance Ovation Award).

He has written and directed numerous highly regarded plays such as "Pot Mom" (which won a Pen West Award), "Teen Girl", "Bitter Women", "Tent Show", and "Coyote Woman".

Justin Tanner also wrote, with then partner Andy Daley: "Zombie Attack", which ran for ten years at the Cast Theater in Hollywood, and has since had numerous revivals.

Career
Tanner was resident playwright of the Cast Theater which was originally run by the late Ted Schmitt and Dana Gibson. In early 1990s, He took control of the Cast Theater and his association with Gibson ended. A several-month revival of several popular Tanner plays resulted.   Tanner & co. left the Cast Theater in late 1999.

His many other projects have included doing a weekly late night live comedy serial called "The Strip" starring, among others, John Waters luminary Mink Stole, and being a staff writer on television's Gilmore Girls and the short lived cult favorite Love Monkey, and directing the yearly Christmas satire "Bob's Office Party".

Tanner's most recent play "Voice Lessons" opened in 2009, and has had an extended run at the Zephyr Theater in Hollywood. The cast includes Laurie Metcalf, French Stewart, and  Maile Flanagan. It was co-directed with Bart DeLorenzo, with whom Tanner became acquainted during the run of "The Strip" at the Evidence Room, where Bart was artistic director.

A later run of "Voice Lessons" at Sacred Fools Theater Company was nominated for four Ovation Awards including Best Play in an Intimate Theatre (Linda Toliver and Gary Guidinger in Association with Sacred Fools Theater Company), Acting Ensemble for a Play (Laurie Metcalf, French Stewart & Maile Flanagan), Lead Actor in a Play (French Stewart as Nate), and Lead Actress in a Play (Laurie Metcalf as Virginia).

"Voice Lessons" received its East Coast Premier at Mad Horse Theater Company in Portland, Maine, opening for a limited run on March 22, 2010.

Personal life
Tanner is openly gay. He stated to The Advocate in 2005 that he was in a relationship with musician Kristian Hoffman.

References
Primary source- Justin Tanner

External links
 Justin Tanner's Official Website 
 The Playwright's Database guide to the works of Justin Tanner 
 Compilation of reviews for Justin Tanner's "Voice Lessons" from Plays 411 

American dramatists and playwrights
Living people
American gay writers
Place of birth missing (living people)
Year of birth missing (living people)
American male dramatists and playwrights